Jérémy Amelin (born July 1, 1986) is a French recording artist. Best known as finalist of French music TV show Star Academy 5.

Biography
Amelin was born on July 1, 1986 in Montargis, France and raised in Montcresson, France.

He was the finalist of French music TV show Star Academy 5, and released three singles.

Amelin appeared as Captain Phoebus in the 10-year anniversary tour of musical Notre Dame de Paris in Seoul, South Korea.

He also performed in the cabaret musicals Flamboyant and Trésor at the Royal Palace in Kirrwiller, France.

Discography

Singles

Music videos

References

External links
 
 
 

1986 births
Living people
French pop singers
English-language singers from France
People from Montargis
Mercury Records artists
20th-century French male singers
21st-century French male singers
People from Loiret